Zetela tangaroa is a species of sea snail, a marine gastropod mollusk in the family Solariellidae.

Description

Distribution

References

 Marshall, B.A. 1999: A revision of the Recent Solariellinae (Gastropoda: Trochoidea) of the New Zealand region. The Nautilus 113: 4-42

External links

tangaroa
Gastropods described in 1999